The AEC Sabre was a bus chassis manufactured by AEC. Launched in 1968, it was aimed at the touring and exports markets, however it was not a success, only four examples being sold. It was the last product introduced under the AEC badge.

References

Sabre
Single-deck buses
Vehicles introduced in 1968